Kulikovsky is a Russian surname. Notable people with the surname include:

Nikolai Kulikovsky (1881–1958)
Olga Kulikovsky (1882–1960)
Mykola Ovsianiko-Kulikovsky (1768–1846)

Russian-language surnames